The Cry of the Owl (Original: Le cri du hibou) is a 1987 French-Italian psychological thriller film, adapted from the 1962 novel The Cry of the Owl by Patricia Highsmith. The film was directed by Claude Chabrol and stars Christophe Malavoy, Mathilda May and Virginie Thévenet.

Divorced illustrator Robert spies on a young woman named Juliette whom he envies for her seemingly happy life. When they finally meet and Juliette leaves her fiancé Patrick for Robert, the situation quickly escalates.

Plot
Parisian illustrator Robert becomes obsessed with a young woman, Juliette. Night after night, Robert sneaks around the house to catch a glimpse of Juliette, until one day he finally gathers the courage to introduce himself. Juliette realizes that she is not happy with her fiancé, Patrick, and leaves him to be with Robert. Robert in turn is not happy with Juliette's obtrusive advances.

One night, Patrick attacks Robert in a deserted area; Robert defends himself and knocks Patrick unconscious, leaving him on the shores of a nearby river. The next day, Robert is interrogated by the police. Patrick is missing, and suddenly Robert is the prime suspect. Nobody knows that Patrick has allied with Robert's bitter ex-wife, Véronique, to take revenge on Robert; he is hiding from the police in order to make them think Robert killed him. Robert's professional and private life falls apart after becoming a police suspect. The situation escalates when Juliette commits suicide, and Patrick launches a vendetta against Robert. In a final confrontation between the men, Véronique is accidentally killed, and although Patrick is defeated, Robert is again left as a suspect in an apparent crime scene.

Cast
 Christophe Malavoy as Robert
 Mathilda May as Juliette
 Jacques Penot as Patrick
 Jean-Pierre Kalfon as Police commissioner
 Virginie Thévenet as Véronique
 Patrice Kerbrat as Marcello
 Jean-Claude Lecas as Jacques
 Agnès Denèfle as Suzie
 Victor Garrivier as Doctor
 Jacques Brunet as Father
 Charles Millot as Director
 Yvette Petit as Neighbor
 Dominique Zardi as Neighbor
 Henri Attal as Cop
 Albert Dray as Cop
 Nadine Hoffmann as Josette
 Gérard Croce as Cop
 Isabelle Charraix as Mme Tessier
 Laurent Picaudon as Boy
 Christian Bouvier as Maître d'hôtel
 Gilles Dreu as M. Tessier

Release
The film premiered on October 28, 1987 in France. It was featured at the Toronto International Film Festival on September 9, 1987. It made its US premiere on October 16, 1991 in New York City. Although released on VHS in many countries, the American DVD is the only available digital release for the home media market at present (2011).

Reception
The Los Angeles Times called it "top-drawer Chabrol", and "a gratifying entertainment of leisurely elegance--and delicious nastiness." IndieWire said it was "classic Chabrol: slow, deliberate, gorgeously scored", and added: "there are shades of Fritz Lang here, as well as Chabrol’s late-’60s efforts." TV Guide remarked that "Chabrol seems just plain too jovially bourgeois to whip himself up to the state of moral implacability that characterizes Hitchcock's utter control of the medium. But, in its own way, The Cry of the Owl is just as unforgettable."

Awards and nominations
César Awards (France)
Won: Most Promising Actress (Mathilda May)
Nominated: Best Actor – Supporting Role (Jean-Pierre Kalfon)

Other adaptations
Also in 1987, German writer-director Tom Toelle directed an adaption for German television titled Der Schrei der Eule.

A third film adaptation written and directed by Jamie Thraves and starring Julia Stiles and Paddy Considine was released in 2009.

References

External links
 

1987 films
1980s psychological thriller films
French neo-noir films
French psychological thriller films
Italian psychological thriller films
Films directed by Claude Chabrol
Films based on American novels
Films based on works by Patricia Highsmith
Films shot in France
Films about stalking
1980s Italian films
1980s French films